The simple interrupted stitch is a suturing technique used to close wounds. It is the most commonly used technique in the closure of skin. It is known as an interrupted stitch because the individual stitches aren't connected; they are separate. Placing and tying each stitch individually is time-consuming, but this technique keeps the wound together even if one suture fails. It is simple, and relatively easy to place. A surgeon's knot or knots cross the wound perpendicularly. The knots should not be left over the wound, but placed to one side in order to avoid scarring and to make the removal of the stitches easier.

References

Surgical stitches